Stefan Hajduk (2 November 1933 – 28 April 1993) was a Polish wrestler. He competed in the men's Greco-Roman flyweight at the 1960 Summer Olympics.

References

External links
 

1933 births
1993 deaths
Polish male sport wrestlers
Olympic wrestlers of Poland
Wrestlers at the 1960 Summer Olympics
People from Kielce County
Sportspeople from Świętokrzyskie Voivodeship
People from Kielce Voivodeship (1919–1939)